Carlo Facchin (27 August 1938 – 27 November 2022) was an Italian football player and manager.

Career
Facchin was the head coach of the Italy women's national team at the 1999 FIFA Women's World Cup.

References

External links
 
 
 
 Carlo Facchin at Soccerdonna.de 

1938 births
2022 deaths
Italian footballers
Association football forwards
Serie A players
A.C. Mestre players
S.P.A.L. players
Rimini F.C. 1912 players
A.C. Monza players
A.C. Reggiana 1919 players
Catania S.S.D. players
Torino F.C. players
L.R. Vicenza players
Reggina 1914 players
S.S. Lazio players
Italian football managers
F.C. Pro Vercelli 1892 managers
Reggina 1914 managers
U.S. Salernitana 1919 managers
U.S. Siracusa managers
Modena F.C. managers
Venezia F.C. managers
Italy women's national football team managers
1999 FIFA Women's World Cup managers
Sportspeople from the Metropolitan City of Venice
People from Portogruaro